Brad Donald Palmer (born September 14, 1961) is a Canadian former professional ice hockey player. He played in the National Hockey League (NHL) with the Minnesota North Stars and Boston Bruins between 1980 and 1983, and then spent several seasons in Europe before retiring in 1992.

Biography
Palmer was born in Duncan, British Columbia and raised in Lake Cowichan, British Columbia. As a youth, he played in the 1974 Quebec International Pee-Wee Hockey Tournament with a minor ice hockey team from Lake Cowichan. He was selected by the Minnesota North Stars with the 16th pick in the 1980 NHL Entry Draft. He played two seasons with the North Stars and then played one year with the Boston Bruins.

His son, Jack Palmer, played in the Western Hockey League with the Brandon Wheat Kings and the Victoria Royals.

Career statistics

Regular season and playoffs

References

External links

1961 births
Living people
Boston Bruins players
BSC Preussen Berlin players
Canadian expatriate ice hockey players in Finland
Canadian ice hockey left wingers
ECH Chur players
EHC Lustenau players
Hershey Bears players
Ice hockey people from British Columbia
Lukko players
Minnesota North Stars draft picks
Minnesota North Stars players
National Hockey League first-round draft picks
People from Duncan, British Columbia
Rote Teufel Bad Nauheim players